The 2016–17 Red Stripe Premier League is the highest competitive football league in Jamaica. It is the 43rd edition of the competition. It started on September 4, 2016. For this season the teams qualifying for the playoffs were increased from four to six teams. Teams ranked from one to two would get a bye to the semi-final round and teams ranked 3 and 6 will play a two leg tie along with teams ranked 4 and 5 for the quarterfinal stage. The two legged tie still remains for the semi-final stage.

Changes from 2015–2016 
 Maverley Hughenden and Jamalco were promoted from the Jamaican Major Leagues (second tier football). 
 Rivoli United and Cavalier  were relegated to the Jamaican Major Leagues (second tier football).

Teams 
Team information.

Managerial Changes

League table

Playoffs

Bracket

Results

Quarterfinals

Semi-finals

Final

Top goalscorers 
Updated as of March 4, 2017

References

External links
 Jamaicafootballfederation.com
 National Premier League

National Premier League seasons
1
Jam